815 Coppelia is a minor planet orbiting the Sun that was discovered by German astronomer Max Wolf on 2 February 1916 from Heidelberg named after Coppélia, a comic ballet.

Photometric observations of this asteroid at the Rozhen Observatory in Bulgaria during 2010 gave a light curve with a period of 4.4565 hours and a brightness variation of 0.24 in magnitude. This is consistent with a period of 4.421 hours and an amplitude of 0.27 obtained during a 2006 study.

References

External links
 
 

000815
Discoveries by Max Wolf
Named minor planets
000815
19160202